Charles Frederick Byrne (23 February 1895 – 30 June 1924) was an Australian rules footballer who played with Fitzroy in the Victorian Football League (VFL).

Notes

External links 

1895 births
1924 deaths
Australian rules footballers from Victoria (Australia)
Fitzroy Football Club players